is a former Japanese long-distance runner who on February 17, 1963 set a world record in the marathon with a time of 2:15:16 at the Beppu Marathon. Terasawa placed second in the marathon at the 1964 Japanese Olympic trials and 15th at the 1964 Summer Olympics. Terasawa is also a two-time champion of the Fukuoka Marathon; he set a Japanese national record during his 1962 victory (2:16:18.4) and improved on it when he won in 1964 (2:14:48.2). At Fukuoka in 1966, he finished fifth (2:15:51.2) after colliding with Jim Hogan, the 1966 European marathon champion, and falling to the pavement just before the half way mark.

When Morio Shigematsu set the world record at the 1965 Polytechnic Marathon, Terasawa finished second. His 2:13:41 performance was the third best ever at the time In 1965, he set his second world record, in the 30 km, and in 1969 he won the Nagano Marathon.

Achievements
All results regarding marathon, unless stated otherwise

References

1935 births
Living people
Japanese male long-distance runners
Japanese male marathon runners
Olympic male marathon runners
Olympic athletes of Japan
Athletes (track and field) at the 1964 Summer Olympics
World record setters in athletics (track and field)
Japan Championships in Athletics winners